The 1911 European Figure Skating Championships were held on February 12 in Saint Petersburg, Russian Empire. Elite figure skaters competed for the title of European Champion in the category of men's singles.

Results

Men

 Referee: Wyacheslav Sresnewsky 
Judges:
 Alexej Lebedev 
 A. Ivanschenkzov 
 Arthur von Dezső 
 Rudolf Sundgrén  (Finland)
 Georg Sanders 
 Sergei Schustov 
 P. Büttner

References

Sources
 Result List provided by the ISU

European Figure Skating Championships, 1911
European Figure Skating Championships
International figure skating competitions hosted by Russia
1911 in the Russian Empire
Sports competitions in Saint Petersburg
February 1911 sports events
1910s in Saint Petersburg